This is a list of members of the Privy Council for Canada appointed from 1948 to 1968.

Ministry

St. Laurent
The Honourable Stuart Sinclair Garson (from November 15, 1948)
The Honourable Robert Henry Winters (from November 15, 1948)
The Honourable Frederick Gordon Bradley (from April 1, 1949)
The Honourable Charles Jost Burchell (from April 1, 1949)
The Honourable Gaspard Fauteux (from May 16, 1949)
The Honourable Hugues Lapointe (from August 25, 1949)
The Honourable Gabriel Édouard Rinfret (from August 25, 1949)
The Honourable Walter Edward Harris (from January 18, 1950)
The Honourable James Langstaff Bowman (from February 23, 1950)
The Honourable George Prudham (from December 13, 1950)
The Honourable George Black (from August 3, 1951)
The Honourable Frederic Erskine Bronson (from August 23, 1951)
The Right Honourable the Earl Alexander of Tunis (from January 29, 1952)
The Honourable Alcide Côté (from February 13, 1952)
The Honourable James Sinclair (from October 15, 1952)
The Honourable Ralph Osborne Campney (from October 15, 1952)
The Honourable Elie Beauregard (from May 12, 1953)
The Honourable William Ross Macdonald (from May 12, 1953)
The Honourable George Alexander Drew (from May 12, 1953)
The Right Honourable John Whitney Pickersgill (from June 12, 1953)
The Right Honourable Thibaudeau Rinfret (from September 16, 1953)
The Honourable Jean Lesage (from September 17, 1953)
The Honourable Patrick Kerwin (from July 1, 1954)
The Honourable George Carlyle Marler (from July 1, 1954)
The Honourable Roch Pinard (from July 1, 1954)
The Honourable H.J. Symington (from November 26, 1956)
The Honourable Louis René Beaudoin (from April 15, 1957)
The Honourable Paul Theodore Hellyer (from April 26, 1957)

Diefenbaker
The Right Honourable John Diefenbaker (from June 21, 1957)
The Honourable Howard Charles Green (from June 21, 1957)
The Honourable Donald Methuen Fleming (from June 21, 1957)
The Honourable Alfred Johnson Brooks (from June 21, 1957)
The Honourable George Harris Hees (from June 21, 1957)
The Honourable Léon Balcer (from June 21, 1957)
The Honourable George Randolph Pearkes (from June 21, 1957)
The Honourable Gordon Churchill (from June 21, 1957)
The Honourable Edmund Davie Fulton (from June 21, 1957)
The Honourable George Clyde Nowlan (from June 21, 1957)
The Honourable Douglas Scott Harkness (from June 21, 1957)
The Right Honourable Ellen Louks Fairclough (from June 21, 1957)
The Honourable John Angus MacLean (from June 21, 1957)
The Honourable Michael Starr (from June 21, 1957)
The Honourable William McLean Hamilton (from June 21, 1957)
The Honourable James McKerras Macdonnell (from June 21, 1957)
The Honourable William Joseph Browne (from June 21, 1957)
The Honourable Paul Comtois (from August 7, 1957)
The Honourable Jay Waldo Monteith (from August 22, 1957)
The Right Honourable Francis Alvin George Hamilton (from August 22, 1957)
The Honourable Sidney Earle Smith (from September 13, 1957)
The Honourable John Thomas Haig (from October 9, 1957)
His Royal Highness Prince Philip, Duke of Edinburgh (from October 14, 1957)
The Honourable Raymond Joseph Michael O'Hurley (from May 12, 1958)
The Honourable Henri Courtemanche (from May 12, 1958)
The Honourable David James Walker (from August 20, 1959)
The Honourable Joseph Pierre Albert Sévigny (from August 20, 1959)
The Honourable Hugh John Flemming (from October 11, 1960)
The Honourable Noël Dorion (from October 11, 1960)
The Honourable Walter Gilbert Dinsdale (from October 11, 1960)
The Honourable Ernest Halpenny (from October 11, 1960)
The Honourable Robert Henry McGregor (from December 21, 1960)
The Honourable Walter Morley Aseltine (from December 28, 1961)
The Honourable Leslie Miscampbell Frost (from December 28, 1961)
The Honourable Jacques Flynn (from December 28, 1961)
The Honourable John Bracken (from May 4, 1962)
The Honourable Paul Martineau (from August 9, 1962)
The Honourable Dick Bell (from August 9, 1962)
The Honourable Malcolm Wallace McCutcheon (from August 9, 1962)
The Honourable Mark Robert Drouin (from October 15, 1962)
The Right Honourable Daniel Roland Michener (from October 15, 1962)
The Honourable Marcel Joseph Aimé Lambert (from February 12, 1963)
The Honourable J.H. Théogène Ricard (from March 18, 1963)
The Honourable Frank Charles McGee (from March 18, 1963)
The Right Honourable Martial Asselin (from March 18, 1963)

Pearson
The Honourable Walter Lockhart Gordon (from April 22, 1963)
The Honourable Mitchell William Sharp (from April 22, 1963)
The Honourable Azellus Denis (from April 22, 1963)
The Honourable George James McIlraith (from April 22, 1963)
The Honourable William Moore Benidickson (from April 22, 1963)
The Honourable Arthur Laing (from April 22, 1963)
The Honourable Maurice Lamontagne (from April 22, 1963)
The Honourable John Richard Garland (from April 22, 1963)
The Honourable Louis Joseph Lucien Cardin (from April 22, 1963)
The Honourable Allan Joseph MacEachen (from April 22, 1963)
The Honourable Jean-Paul Deschatelets (from April 22, 1963)
The Honourable Hédard Robichaud (from April 22, 1963)
The Honourable John Watson MacNaught (from April 22, 1963)
The Honourable Roger Joseph Teillet (from April 22, 1963)
The Honourable Julia Verlyn LaMarsh (from April 22, 1963)
The Honourable Charles Mills Drury (from April 22, 1963)
The Honourable Guy Favreau (from April 22, 1963)
The Honourable John Robert Nicholson (from April 22, 1963)
The Honourable Harry Hays (from April 22, 1963)
The Honourable René Tremblay (from April 22, 1963)
The Right Honourable Robert Taschereau (from April 26, 1963)
The Honourable John Joseph Connolly (from February 3, 1964)
The Honourable Maurice Sauvé (from February 3, 1964)
The Honourable Yvon Dupuis (from February 3, 1964)
The Honourable George Stanley White (from June 25, 1964)
The Honourable Major James William Coldwell (from June 25, 1964)
The Honourable Henry Duncan Graham Crerar (from June 25, 1964)
The Honourable Edgar John Benson (from June 29, 1964)
The Honourable Léo Alphonse Joseph Cadieux (from February 15, 1965)
The Honourable Lawrence T. Pennell (from July 7, 1965)
The Right Honourable Jean-Luc Pépin (from July 7, 1965)
The Honourable Alan Aylesworth Macnaughton (from October 25, 1965)
The Honourable Jean Marchand (from December 18, 1965)
The Honourable John James Greene (from December 18, 1965)
The Honourable Joseph Julien Jean-Pierre Côté (from December 18, 1965)
The Right Honourable John Turner (from December 18, 1965)
The Honourable Maurice Bourget (from February 22, 1966)
The Right Honourable Pierre Elliott Trudeau (from April 4, 1967)
The Right Honourable Joseph Jacques Jean Chrétien (from April 4, 1967)
The Honourable Pauline Vanier (from April 11, 1967)
The Honourable John Parmenter Robarts (from July 5, 1967)
The Honourable Daniel Johnson, Sr (from July 5, 1967)
The Honourable Louis Joseph Robichaud (from July 5, 1967)
The Honourable Dufferin Roblin (from July 5, 1967)
The Honourable William Andrew Cecil Bennett (from July 5, 1967)
The Honourable Alexander Bradshaw Campbell (from July 5, 1967)
The Honourable Wilbert Ross Thatcher (from July 5, 1967)
The Honourable Ernest Charles Manning (from July 5, 1967)
The Honourable Joseph Roberts Smallwood (from July 5, 1967)
The Right Honourable Robert Lorne Stanfield (from July 7, 1967)
The Right Honourable John Robert Cartwright (from September 4, 1967)
The Honourable Charles Ronald McKay Granger (from September 25, 1967)
The Honourable Bryce Stuart Mackasey (from February 9, 1968)

See also
List of current members of the Queen's Privy Council for Canada
List of members of the Privy Council for Canada (1867–1911)
List of members of the Privy Council for Canada (1911–1948)
List of members of the Privy Council for Canada (1968–2005)
List of members of the Privy Council for Canada (2006–present)

References

 

1948-1968